Anjengo was an 18th and 19th century British name for:

Anchuthengu and its associated British East India Company fort and residence.
, a ship launched at Anjengo.